Stephanie Slater,  (born 7 February 1991) is a British Paralympic swimmer competing in S8 classification events. Slater began her sporting career as an able bodied athlete, but after suffering nerve damage to her left arm she switched to parasport. In 2013, she qualified for the Swimming World Championships in Montreal.

Early career
Slater was born in 1991 in Preston, England and began swimming from the age of three. A talented swimmer as a youth, Slater challenged as an able bodied athlete and began entering British Championships from 2006. Specialising in the breaststroke, she continually improved during the British Championships, finishing 4th in the 100 m breaststroke final in 2009. In the 2010 Championship, she took silver in the 50 m breaststroke and was seen as a prospect for the British team at the 2010 Commonwealth Games in Delhi, and a future Olympic athlete.

While training at Team GB's Intensive Training Centre in Swansea, she experienced severe weakness and intense pain to her left arm while swimming. The injury did not clear and she was forced to pull out from her goal of making the Commonwealth Games. After two years of several tests and scans, it was diagnosed that Slater had suffered nerve damage to her brachial plexus which ended her career as an able-bodied athlete. Slater also suffers from a degenerative eye condition affecting both eyes.
Slater was also born with a rare genetic condition.

World Championships
Slater returned home to Preston to her family after her condition had been diagnosed, and having been a games maker at the London 2012 Paralympics in the Aquatics Centre, this inspired her to return to the pool as a para-swimmer. In December 2012 she began entering events as a para-swimmer. She entered the British International Disability Swimming Championships in Sheffield in April 2013. There she set a British and European record when she recorded a time of 1:11.03 in the 100 m Butterfly S8. Not only did she take the gold medal with this record time, but she also qualified for her first World Championships in Montreal.

At the IPC Swimming World Championships in Montreal 2013, Slater competed in the Women's 200m IM SM8, Women's 100m Breastroke SB8, Women's 100m Butterfly S8 and the Women's 34pt 4 × 100 m Medley Relay.
Women's 200m IM SM8 – Silver – 2.40.73 – European record
Women's 100m Breaststroke SB8 – 5th – 1.26.34
Women's 100m Butterfly S8 – Silver – 1.10.12 – European record
Women's 34pt 4 × 100 m Medley Relay (Butterfly Leg) – Gold –  4.46.21  – world record

Commonwealth Games 2014
On 22 May 2014 Slater was named as part of the England team which will compete at the 2014 Commonwealth Games in Scotland. She will be entering the S8 100m Freestyle event and was quoted as stating, "I feel very privileged to have been selected to represent England in what will be my first Commonwealth Games".

European Championships 2014
After the Commonwealth Games, Slater will be heading to the IPC European Championships, in Eindhoven, the Netherlands, in August. She secured five European Championship selection times.

Stephanie had a very successful debut at the IPC European Championships in Eindhoven. She competed in 5 individual events and two relay swims.

 Women's S8 100m Butterfly – 1.08.20 – GOLD – World Record
 Women's S8 50m Freestyle – 30.44 – GOLD – European Record
 Women's S8 100m Freestyle – 1.07.03 – GOLD
 Women's S8 100m -Backstroke – 1.17.42 – GOLD
 Women's SM8 200m Individual Medley – 2.41.73 – GOLD
 Women's 34pt 4 × 100 m Medley Relay (Butterfly leg) – 4.46.89 – GOLD
 Women's 34pt 4 × 100 m Freestyle Relay – 4.27.21 – GOLD

Paralympic Games 2016 
At the 2016 Rio Paralympics, Slater won gold in the women's 4 x 100m medley relay 34pts and silver in the women's S8 100m Butterfly.

Retirement 
In February 2018, Slater announced her retirement, due to the degeneration of her medical conditions.

References

Living people
1991 births
English female freestyle swimmers
Swimmers at the 2014 Commonwealth Games
Commonwealth Games silver medallists for England
Commonwealth Games medallists in swimming
Paralympic swimmers of Great Britain
Paralympic gold medalists for Great Britain
Paralympic silver medalists for Great Britain
Swimmers at the 2016 Summer Paralympics
Members of the Order of the British Empire
Medalists at the 2016 Summer Paralympics
Medalists at the World Para Swimming Championships
Medalists at the World Para Swimming European Championships
Paralympic medalists in swimming
British female backstroke swimmers
British female butterfly swimmers
S8-classified Paralympic swimmers
21st-century British women
Medallists at the 2014 Commonwealth Games